Johanna Ehrnrooth (June 23, 1958 – May 26, 2020) was a Finnish painter.

References

2020 deaths
1958 births
Artists from Helsinki
Finnish women painters
20th-century Finnish painters
21st-century Finnish painters